Kepler-41b, formerly known as KOI-196b, is a planet in the orbit of star Kepler-41. It is a hot Jupiter with about the density of water. It reflects about a third of the starlight it receives. The brightest spot in the planetary atmosphere is shifted westward from the substellar point, indicating strong winds.

References

41b
Exoplanets discovered in 2011
Cygnus (constellation)
Giant planets